Frailie is an extinct town in New Madrid County, in the U.S. state of Missouri. The GNIS classifies it as a populated place.

Frailie once had a schoolhouse. The community has the name of one Mr. Frailie, the proprietor of a local sawmill.

References

Ghost towns in Missouri
Former populated places in New Madrid County, Missouri